Eugene C. Filipski (June 14, 1931 – August 23, 1994) was an American football halfback who played two seasons with the New York Giants of the National Football League. He was drafted by the Cleveland Browns in the seventh round of the 1953 NFL Draft. He first enrolled at the United States Military Academy before transferring to Villanova University. Filipski attended Grant Union High School in Sacramento, California. He was also a member of the Calgary Stampeders of the Canadian Football League.

References

External links
Just Sports Stats
Gene Filipski CFL trading card

1931 births
1994 deaths
Players of American football from Massachusetts
American football halfbacks
Army Black Knights football players
Villanova Wildcats football players
New York Giants players
Calgary Stampeders players
People from Webster, Massachusetts
Sportspeople from Worcester County, Massachusetts
Military personnel from Massachusetts